Herderite is a phosphate mineral belonging to the apatite, phosphate group, with formula CaBe(PO4)(F,OH).  It forms monoclinic crystals, often twinned and variable in colour from colourless through yellow to green. It forms a series with the more common hydroxylherderite, which has more hydroxyl ion than fluoride. 

It is found in many parts of the world, often in pegmatites and associated with other apatite minerals.

It was first described in 1828 for an occurrence in the Sauberg Mine, Erzgebirge, Saxony, Germany. It was named for Saxon mining official Sigmund August Wolfgang von Herder (1776–1838).

References

Calcium minerals
Beryllium minerals
Phosphate minerals
Fluorine minerals
Monoclinic minerals
Minerals in space group 14